Casupá is a town in the Florida Department of southern-central Uruguay.

Geography

History
Casupá was founded on 15 September 1908, and on 12 June 1924, it was declared "Pueblo" (village) by the Act of Ley N° 7.728. It was then elevated to the category of "Villa" (town) on 5 July 1956 by the Act of Ley No. 12.297.

Population
In 2011, Casupá had a population of 2,402.
 
Source: Instituto Nacional de Estadística de Uruguay

Places of worship
 Parish Church of Mary Help of Christians (Roman Catholic)

References

External links
INE map of Casupá

Populated places in the Florida Department